Debren Pass (‘Prohod Debren’ \'pro-hod 'de-bren\) is the ice-covered saddle of elevation 2245 m on the east side of Sentinel Range in Ellsworth Mountains, Antarctica separating Mount Jumper from the side ridge descending via Evans Peak.  It is part of the glacial divide between Rumyana Glacier and Patton Glacier.

The feature is named after the settlement of Debren in southwestern Bulgaria.

Location
US mapping in 1988.

Maps
 Vinson Massif.  Scale 1:250 000 topographic map.  Reston, Virginia: US Geological Survey, 1988.
 Antarctic Digital Database (ADD). Scale 1:250000 topographic map of Antarctica. Scientific Committee on Antarctic Research (SCAR). Since 1993, regularly updated.

Notes

References
 Debren Pass. SCAR Composite Antarctic Gazetteer.
 Bulgarian Antarctic Gazetteer. Antarctic Place-names Commission. (details in Bulgarian, basic data in English)

External links
 Debren Pass. Copernix satellite image

Mountain passes of Ellsworth Land
Bulgaria and the Antarctic